Enrique Augusto Jara Saguier (born 12 July 1934 in Asunción, Paraguay) is a former football player. Enrique is one of the seven Jara Saguier brothers that played professional football in Paraguay.

Career
Enrique Jara Saguier spent most of his career playing for Cerro Porteño, team in which he made his debut in 1950. At the national team level, Enrique was part of the Paraguay squad that competed in the qualifiers for the 1958 FIFA World Cup, in which Paraguay competed.

Titles

As player

References

Paraguayan footballers
Cerro Porteño players
Paraguay international footballers
Sportspeople from Asunción
Living people
1934 births
Association football forwards